The Highland Railway's Clan Goods class was a class of steam locomotive.  They were designed by Christopher Cumming. The first four (Nos 75 to 78) were built by Hawthorn Leslie and Company on Tyneside, and the maker's plates bore the date 1917, but because of wartime delays were not delivered until 1918. Four more (Nos. 79 to 82) were built in 1919, also by Hawthorn Leslie.

Dimensions

Transfer to LMS
All eight entered service with the London, Midland and Scottish Railway (LMS) in January 1923. They were classified '5F' by the LMS.

Transfer to BR
Six locomotives survived to enter British Railways (BR) service in 1948, of which five were given BR numbers.

Numbering

References

Clan Goods
4-6-0 locomotives
Hawthorn Leslie and Company locomotives
Railway locomotives introduced in 1917
Scrapped locomotives

Freight locomotives